Ronald Michael Pope (born July 23, 1983) is an American pop and rock singer-songwriter. He is currently based in Nashville.

Background and career
Pope was raised in Marietta, Georgia. He attended East Cobb Middle School and Joseph Wheeler High School. He began playing the guitar at an early age.

After high school, he attended Rutgers University for two years to play baseball. After a career-ending injury, he transferred to New York University in 2003 to pursue his interest in music. After joining a songwriting circle with fellow students, he met friends and future band mates, Zach Berkman and Paul Hammer. In 2007, he co–wrote the internet hit "A Drop in the Ocean" with Zach Berkman. 
From there, they created The District with Chris Kienel, Will Frish and Mike Clifford. Following success as a college band, they toured for two years and recorded three albums: The District, The District Does Christmas, and Last Call. In December 2010, The District reunited to record "Wellfleet"

In March 2008, Pope performed on MTV's TRL as a featured up-and-coming artist. Independently, he wrote, produced, and released four full-length albums: Daylight (2008), The Bedroom Demos (2009), Goodbye, Goodnight (2009) and Hello, Love (2010).

In May 2009, Pope signed a year-long recording contract with record label Universal Republic, with whom he released two singles, "A Drop in the Ocean" and "I Believe". Since leaving the label, he has produced and released his music independently.

Ron founded the record label, Brooklyn Basement Records, alongside his wife, Blair. The roster now includes rock artist Truett.

On March 6, 2017, he took part in a benefit concert celebrating the music of Aretha Franklin at Carnegie Hall.

Television placements
He has had two songs placed on FOX's So You Think You Can Dance in both Canada and the US. He was featured in the season three premiere of The Vampire Diaries on The CW. "A Drop in the Ocean" was performed on the UK television show Made in Chelsea by the British reality star Caggie Dunlop, and also in the fourth season of 90210. He also guest starred in season 3 episode 17 of Nashville.

Discography

References

External links

 Ron Pope profile on TheMusicNinja

1983 births
Living people
American rock songwriters
American male singer-songwriters
American male pop singers
American rock singers
21st-century American singers
21st-century American male singers
Singer-songwriters from Georgia (U.S. state)